Cheney often refers to:
 Cheney (surname), people with the name
 C. R. Cheney (1906-1987), English historian
 Dick Cheney (born 1941), 46th vice president of the United States
 Liz Cheney (born 1966), American attorney and Wyoming conservative politician, daughter of Dick Cheney
 Mary Cheney (born 1969), younger daughter of Dick Cheney

Cheney may also refer to:

Places

Canada
Cheney, Ontario, a community in the city of Clarence-Rockland

United States
Cheney, Kansas
Cheney, Missouri
Cheney, Nebraska
Cheney, Washington

Buildings
Cheney School, Oxford, United Kingdom
Cheney Stadium, Tacoma, Washington

See also
 Cheyney (disambiguation)
 Chaney (disambiguation)
 Chanay, a commune in the French département of Ain
 Cheny, a commune of the Yonne département in France